I Can See Your Voice is a Dutch television mystery music game show series based on the South Korean programme of the same name. Since its premiere on 29 October 2020, it has aired four seasons on RTL 4.

Gameplay

Format
Presented with a group of seven "mystery singers" identified only by their occupation, a guest artist and contestant must attempt to eliminate bad singers from the group without ever hearing them sing, assisted by clues and a celebrity panel over the course of four rounds. At the end of the game, the last remaining mystery singer is revealed as either good or bad by means of a duet between them and one of the guest artists.

Rewards
Until the third season, if the singer is good, the contestant wins ; if the singer is bad, the same amount is given to the bad singer instead.

For the fourth season, the contestant must eliminate one mystery singer at the end of each round, receiving  if they eliminate a bad singer. If the singer is bad, the contestant's winnings is given to the bad singer instead.

Rounds
Each episode presents the guest artist and contestant with seven people whose identities and singing voices are kept concealed until they are eliminated to perform on the "stage of truth" or remain in the end to perform the final duet.

Notes:

Production

Background and development
RTL Nederland first announced the development of the series in March 2020, following the successful broadcasts of The Masked Singer. It is produced by Warner Bros. International Television Production; the staff team is managed by executive producer Pieter Cerutti and producer Marlous Westerveld.

Filming

Since from first to second season, the programme was filmed under health and safety protocols due to the COVID-19 pandemic.

Broadcast

History
I Can See Your Voice was initially scheduled to made its debut broadcast on 8 May 2020, but it was delayed until it happened on 29 October 2020. After the first season broadcasts, the series has been already renewed for the second season that premiered on 22 April 2021. The third season premiered on its earlier date on 21 January 2022, and then the fourth season followed on 31 August 2022.

Special episodes
Instead of contestant-oriented format, the Dutch counterpart utilised on original South Korean traditional format, when  played in the kids special (from second season on 10 June 2021). Two months after the fourth-season finale,  played in the holiday special on 22 December 2022.

Cast
The series employs a team of "celebrity panelists" who decipher mystery singers' evidences throughout the game. Alongside with full-timers and additional ones, guest panelists also appear since the first season. Throughout its broadcast, the programme has assigned 7 different panelists. Beside with original cast, later additions also include Danny de Munk and Edsilia Rombley (from second season).

Series overview

Episodes

Season 1 (2020)

Season 2 (2021)

Season 3 (2022)

Season 4 (2022)

Specials

Notes

References

External links

I Can See Your Voice (Dutch game show)
2020s Dutch television series
2020 Dutch television series debuts
Dutch game shows
Dutch television series based on South Korean television series
Dutch-language television shows
RTL 4 original programming